Generation Zero may refer to :

Generation Zero, a 2010 American documentary film written and directed by Steve Bannon, and produced by David N. Bossie for Citizens United Productions
Generation Zero (organisation), a New-Zealand youth-led environmental organisation.
Generation Zero (video game), a first person shooter video game by Avalanche Studios